Soccsksargen (officially stylized in all caps), formerly known as Central Mindanao, is an administrative region of the Philippines, designated as Region XII. Located in south-central Mindanao, its name is an acronym that stands for the region's four provinces and one highly urbanized city (South Cotabato, Cotabato, Sultan Kudarat, Sarangani and General Santos). The regional center is in Koronadal, located in the province of South Cotabato, and the center of commerce and industry is General Santos, which is the most populous city in the region.

Geography
The region is bounded on the north by Northern Mindanao, on the east by the Davao Region, and on the southwest by the Celebes Sea. The region also shares a maritime border with Gorontalo and North Sulawesi provinces of Indonesia. The province of Maguindanao is situated between Cotabato City, North Cotabato province, and Sultan Kudarat.

The region has extensive coastlines, valleys and mountain ranges. Known for its river system, the region is the drainage basin of Mindanao, particularly at the Cotabato Basin, a large depression surrounded by mountain ranges on three sides. Within the basin runs the Rio Grande de Mindanao, the longest river in Mindanao and the second longest in the Philippines. The river empties into the Illana Bay of the larger Moro Gulf at the west of Cotabato City.

At the south of the basin lie the Tiruray Highlands, a moderately high mountain range blocking the basin from the southern coastline. Southeast of the mountains lie the Sarangani Bay.

Administrative divisions

Provinces
Soccsksargen comprises 4 provinces, 1 highly urbanized city, 3 component cities, 45 municipalities and 1,195 barangays.

Governors and vice governors

Cities

Component cities

 Kidapawan —  the only city of Cotabato province
 † Koronadal — the political regional center of Soccsksargen
 Tacurong — only city of Sultan Kudarat

Highly-urbanized city

 General Santos — a highly urbanized city, it serves as the center of the Metropolitan and Regional Center for trade and industry of Soccsksargen.

History
The oldest civilization in the region is located in Maitum, Sarangani, where the Maitum Anthropomorphic Pottery were found. The jars have been declared as National Cultural Treasures, and are subject to the high protections ensured by Philippine and international laws.

Central Mindanao
The region used to be named Central Mindanao. Prior to the creation of the Autonomous Region in Muslim Mindanao (ARMM) it comprised the following provinces:
 Maguindanao
 North Cotabato
 Sultan Kudarat
 Lanao del Norte
 Lanao del Sur

With the creation of ARMM, Lanao del Sur and Maguindanao (excluding Cotabato City) were removed from the region, leaving Lanao del Norte, Cotabato and Sultan Kudarat, and Iligan, Marawi and Cotabato City as constituent provinces and cities. Lanao del Norte and Iligan were later transferred to Northern Mindanao, while Marawi became part of the ARMM.

On February 23, 1995, Sultan Kudarat transferred from ARMM back to Central Mindanao.

Soccsksargen
In September 2001, Executive Order No. 36 was signed by President Gloria Macapagal Arroyo transferring South Cotabato, Sarangani, General Santos (also known as the SocSarGen District), from Southern Mindanao to Region XII, and renaming the region, from Central Mindanao, to Soccsksargen.

Koronadal as new regional center
By virtue of Executive Order No. 304 signed by then President Gloria Macapagal Arroyo, Koronadal was named as the regional political and socio-economic center of Soccsksargen on March 30, 2004. Regional departments, bureaus and offices were ordered to move from Cotabato City, the former regional center of the region.

Special Cotabato barangays and Cotabato City exit
Traditionally resisting efforts for inclusion to the Autonomous Region in Muslim Mindanao despite serving as the government center of the ARMM, the January 21, 2019 Bangsamoro Autonomous Region creation plebiscite resulted in the surprise ratification of the Bangsamoro Organic Law in Cotabato City. This means the city may now formally serve as the capital of the region and the offices of the former ARMM will be retained for use by the Bangsamoro Regional Government and now formally no longer constitutes part of the Soccsksargen Region.

In addition to Cotabato City, 63 barangays in Cotabato province opted to join Bangsamoro, thus exiting the region as well.

Demographics

Economy

The region contributes to the national GDP with 2.6% with 5% growth compared to 2016. 18.3% of Mindanao Gross Regional Domestic Product (GRDP).

Musical heritage

The culture of native Maguindanaon and other native groups, both Muslim and non-Muslim, revolves around kulintang music, a specific type of gong music, found in the Soccsksargen.

Government
 Cotabato – Gov. Nancy A. Catamco (PDP-Laban)
 South Cotabato – Gov. Reynaldo S. Tamayo Jr. (Partido Federal ng Pilipinas (PFP)
 Sultan Kudarat – Gov. Datu Suharto "Teng" T. Mangudadatu (NUP)
 Sarangani – Gov. Ruel D. Pacquiao (PCM)
 General Santos (HUC) – Mayor Lorelie "Lor" Pacquiao

References

External links 
 
 
 

 
Regions of the Philippines
Geographical neologisms